Vuolijoki is a former municipality in Finland. The municipality was consolidated with the city of Kajaani in the beginning of year 2007.

Vuolijoki was located in the province of Oulu on the shores of Lake Oulujärvi, and was part of the Kainuu region. In 2004 the municipality had a population of 2,643 and covered an area of 895.20 km2 of which 203.05 km2 was water. The population density was 3.8 inhabitants per km2. The municipality was unilingually Finnish.

The 1906 greystone church, the Vuolijoki Church, designed by Josef Stenbäck, is located in the church village of Vuolijoki. The Vuolijoki was also known for its two iron mines: the Otanmäki mine and the Vuorokas mine.

See also
Otanmäki

References

External links

 Official website of Vuolijoki municipality 
 Kymmenen kylän Vuolijoki - Kajaani.fi  

Former municipalities of Finland
Kajaani